Edith Mary Swepstone (4 January 1862 – 5 February 1942) was an English composer and music teacher. She was born in Stepney, London, the daughter of a London solicitor. She studied music at the Guildhall School and later worked as a lecturer at the City of London School. She died in Tonbridge, Kent.

Career
She studied music at the Guildhall School in London, England and later worked as a lecturer at the City of London School. In 1895 she was giving music lectures at the City School of London.

As a composer, Swepstone wrote early 20th-century orchestral music, chamber music, and songs. During the first quarter of the 20th century, she had many of her orchestral works performed by the Bournemouth Municipal Orchestra, the most by a single composer. Though the music is not located, 14 of Swepstone’s orchestral works were presented in a total of 24 performances, between 1899 and 1933. There are only two recorded instances of her orchestra music having been performed elsewhere; in March 1887 at Leyton (a movement from Symphony in G minor), and in February 1897 at Queen's Hall in London (Les Tenebres).

At the South Place Concert Series, a weekly chamber music concert series in London, between 1887–1987, 1,121 works were performed and women composers make up for only 13 of those compositions. Swepstone’s piece, Piano Quintet in E minor, was performed a total of four times at the concert series. Swepstone’s influence is apparent in that, of all the pieces played at the series and written by women, over half were her compositions.

In total, seven of her chamber music compositions were performed at the series. In addition to Piano Quintet E Minor, played four times, the following works were each performed once: Quintet D Hn & String Quartet, Quintet E-flat Pf and Wind, String Quartet Lyrical Cycle, Piano Trio D minor, Piano Trio G minor, Piano Trio A minor.

Works
Swepstone wrote chamber music, and also songs and choral music. Selected works include:
The Four Ships
Foreshadowings
A Song of Twilight with A.R. Aldrich
Symphony in G minor
Robert Louis Stevenson's Songs for Children Set to Music
Three-Part Song for female voices, with Pianoforte Accompaniment, words by F.R. Haverga
Les Tenebres overture
Honour March
Lament, for Violin and Piano
The Crocuses' Lament, Two-Part Song for female voices
Requiem for Violoncello and Piano
A Song of Twilight with A.R. Aldrich
Robert Louis Stevenson's Songs for Children Set to Music
Three-Part Song for female voices, with Pianoforte Accompaniment, words by F.R. Haverga
The Crocuses' Lament, Two-Part Song for female voices
The Ice Queen, cantata, female voice
Idylls of the Morn, cantata, female voice

Orchestral works

 Daramona, symphonic poem, 1899
 The Ice Maiden, suite, 1900
 Symphony in G minor, 1902
 Les Tenebres overture, 1903
 Paolo and Francesca, prelude, 1904
 Mors Janua Vitae, funeral march, 1906
 The Wind in the Pines, symphonic poem, 1909
 The Horn of Roland, overture, 1910
 Moonrise on the Mountains, symphonic poem, 1912
 Woods in April, symphonic poem, 1914
 The Roll of Honour, march, 1916
 Morte d’Arthur, symphonic poem, 1920
 The Four Ships, suite, 1927

Chamber works

 Piano Quintet in F minor
 Piano Quintet in E minor
 Quintet D Hn & String Quartet
 Quintet in E flat, Piano and Wind
 String Quartet Lyrical Cycle
 Piano Trio D minor
 Piano Trio G minor
 Piano Trio A minor

Other works

 Lament, for Violin and Piano
 Requiem for Violoncello and Piano
 Foreshadowings, with violoncello accompaniment

References

1862 births
1942 deaths
20th-century classical composers
British music educators
Women classical composers
English classical composers
People from Stepney
Musicians from London
Alumni of the Guildhall School of Music and Drama
20th-century English composers
20th-century English women musicians
Women music educators
20th-century women composers